Parker Christian Posey (born November 8, 1968) is an American actress and musician. Posey is the recipient of a Golden Globe Award nomination, a Satellite Award nomination and two Independent Spirit Award nominations.

Posey made her film debut in Joey Breaker (1993). Following small roles in Coneheads and the cult classic Dazed and Confused (both also 1993), she was labeled "Queen of the Indies" for starring in a succession of independent films throughout the 1990s, such as Sleep with Me (1994), Frisk, Party Girl, The Doom Generation, and Kicking and Screaming (all 1995). Her other notable film appearances include You've Got Mail (1998), Scream 3 (2000), Blade: Trinity (2004), Superman Returns (2006), and Café Society (2016). She frequently works with Christopher Guest and has appeared in several of his mockumentaries: Waiting for Guffman (1996), Best in Show (2000), A Mighty Wind (2003), For Your Consideration (2006), and Mascots (2016).

Outside of film, Posey starred in the television movie Hell on Heels: The Battle of Mary Kay (2002) and has guest-starred on numerous series, such as Futurama (2000), The Simpsons (2000), Will & Grace (2001), Boston Legal (2006), Parks and Recreation (2011), The Good Wife (2011–12), Louie (2012), Inside Amy Schumer (2014), and Search Party (2016). From 2018 to 2021, she starred as Dr. Smith on the Netflix series Lost in Space.

Early life
Posey was born November 8, 1968, in Baltimore, Maryland, to Lynda (née Patton), a chef, and Chris Posey, owner of a car dealership. She has a twin brother, Christopher. After Posey's birth, her family lived in Monroe, Louisiana, for 11 years. They later moved to Laurel, Mississippi, where her mother worked as a chef and culinary instructor for the Viking Range Corporation in Greenwood and her father operated a car dealership. Posey was raised Catholic.

Career

Acting
Posey attended the State University of New York at Purchase, where she studied drama.

Posey got her first break in television with the role of Tess Shelby on the daytime soap opera As the World Turns. Posey's first major role in a feature film was in Dazed and Confused (1993). The film received favorable reviews from critics and has been identified as a cult classic.

In 1994, she appeared in Hal Hartley's short film Opera No. 1. Throughout the late 1990s, Posey co-starred in 32 independent films and was nicknamed "Queen of the Indies". These films include Personal Velocity, Basquiat, Clockwatchers, The Daytrippers, Party Girl and The House of Yes. In particular, she received positive reviews for The House of Yes, for her role as a delusional woman in love with her own brother. In an interview in January 2012, Parker said that the unofficial title has sometimes been a hindrance:

She has co-starred in many of Christopher Guest's films, including five of his mock documentaries, the first being Waiting for Guffman in 1996. In 1998, Posey appeared in Hartley's film Henry Fool, and the big-budget studio film You've Got Mail.

 
In 2000, she starred in Guest's third mock documentary Best in Show and in the big-budget horror film Scream 3. Critical reaction to Posey's performance in the latter film was highly positive and earned her an MTV Movie Award nomination. The next year she starred in Josie and the Pussycats. From 2001 to 2002, she appeared in a supporting role in the popular NBC sitcom Will & Grace.

In 2003, she starred in Guest's A Mighty Wind. The next year she appeared in Sisters of Mercy, Laws of Attraction, and Blade: Trinity. Posey then co-starred in the 2005 film Adam & Steve.

In 2006, Posey appeared in Superman Returns as Kitty Kowalski, Lex Luthor's ditzy sidekick, a character based on Eve Teschmacher from the 1978 film Superman. Posey was the only actress considered for the role. Superman Returns was a box-office success. The film was also successful at the 33rd Saturn Awards. Posey, a few fellow cast members, and the visual effects department were all nominated. Later the same year, she played the title character in Fay Grim, the sequel to Henry Fool, and appeared in For Your Consideration.

In 2007, Posey was cast in the lead role in the television series The Return of Jezebel James. The show was originally given a 13-episode order, but the show was cut to seven episodes in anticipation of a pending scriptwriters’ strike. It premiered on the Fox television network in 2008 as a mid-season replacement. However, the show was officially canceled after the third episode aired owing to low ratings.

Posey starred in Zoe Cassavetes' 2007 film Broken English. Broken English screened at the 2007 Sundance Film Festival. It was also entered into the 29th Moscow International Film Festival. The film was nominated at the 23rd Independent Spirit Awards for Best First Screenplay and Posey was nominated for Best Female Lead. She was set to co-star in John Waters' film Fruitcake. The film was to be set in her hometown of Baltimore, Maryland. However, in 2018, Waters announced that he had canceled Fruitcake, saying "I can't get it made... I thought it would do well, but it's not. In this economy, I'm going to have to do a puppet show."

In 2012, Posey starred in four episodes of the third season of Louie as Liz, Louis C.K.'s love interest. She received positive reviews for her stint on the show. The website Vulture stated: "Posey is superb in a brilliantly written role." Lindsay Bahr of Entertainment Weekly said "Posey used her arsenal of talent and the material written and directed by C.K. to bring Liz to life". Andy Greenwald of GrantLand felt Posey was "funny, engaging, and breathless" and went on to call Posey "one of the most gifted actors alive". Later the same year, she was honored with the Excellence in Acting Award at the Provincetown International Film Festival.

Posey appeared in Ned Rifle, the third and final film in Hartley's Henry Fool trilogy, again reprising her role of Fay Grim. On November 6, 2013, Hartley launched a fundraising campaign through Kickstarter to produce the film, netting a total of $384,000. Posey, along with several other cast members as well as some crew members, appeared in several videos promoting the campaign. The film premiered on September 7, 2014, at the 2014 Toronto International Film Festival. It was also screened in the Panorama section of the 65th Berlin International Film Festival on February 6, 2015.

In July 2014, it was announced that Posey had signed on to co-star in Woody Allen's mystery drama Irrational Man. The film had its world premiere on May 16, 2015, at the 2015 Cannes Film Festival. In July 2015, Parker revealed that before being cast in the film, she had considered quitting acting, as she feared that she "saw the independent film movement go away from me... it's a world market now. They're made from real star power. Whoever's hot at the moment." When Allen cast her, she cried, as "the independent film way of working is something that was in my bones. It's like being a part of a punk band but no one's singing punk rock anymore. Only a few bands are able to play, and Woody Allen is one of them. That's why I cried. It was a relief."

From 2018-2021, she appeared as Dr. Smith in Lost in Space, the Netflix remake of the 1965 TV series.

In 2022 she starred in episode two of Tales of the Walking Dead, an anthology series based on the AMC series The Walking Dead

Audio fiction
In late 2019, Posey starred in an audio fiction podcast called Hunted wherein she plays the part of U.S. Deputy Marshal tracking four escaped convicts from a federal maximum-security correctional facility. The eight-episode show is produced by Wolf Entertainment and Endeavor Audio.

Stage and music
Posey appeared on Broadway in 2000, playing in Elaine May's Taller Than a Dwarf, which was directed by Alan Arkin. She later appeared off Broadway in David Rabe's Hurlyburly in 2005, and then originated the role of Pony Jones in Will Eno's The Realistic Joneses in 2012.

She learned to play the mandolin to prepare for her role in A Mighty Wind (2003), a film in which she also sang. She provided vocals on several of her ex-boyfriend Ryan Adams' records. She also played the mandolin on The Dandy Warhols track "I Am Sound" from their Welcome to the Monkey House LP.

Memoir 
You're on an Airplane: A Self-Mythologizing Memoir is Parker Posey's first book. Centered on the idea that the reader is sitting next to Posey on an airplane, the book mixes personal anecdotes from her career, random observations, stories about her life, and homemade photo collages. The book received critical acclaim. Vogue wrote "Excellent...a celebration of peculiarity." According to Elle magazine, the memoir is "a humour-packed, irreverent, eccentric book packed with personal stories, whimsical how-tos and recipes, as well as collages made by her." Esquire wrote "Posey is a natural storyteller; performing, in any way really, is mostly about sharing stories. And she's gathered some good ones for her memoir, which also perfectly encapsulates the delightful weirdo you assume she is just by watching her play different people on screen."

Personal life
Posey has lived in both Greenwich Village and the East Village.

In a 2000 interview Posey recounted a time in 1998 when she left her life in the U.S.  "I just dropped out. I went all over – Morocco, Australia, Sweden, Finland, France. I was gone for, God, like a year and a half."

Filmography

Film

Television

Stage

Awards and nominations
Won the Sundance Film Festival Award for Special Recognition for The House of Yes (1997)
Nominated for the Satellite Award for Best Actress – Motion Picture Musical or Comedy for The House of Yes (1997)
Nominated for the MTV Movie Award for Best Comedic Performance for Scream 3 (2000)
Nominated for a Golden Globe Award for Best Supporting Actress – Series, Miniseries or Television Film for Hell on Heels: The Battle of Mary Kay (2002)
Nominated for a Independent Spirit Award for Best Lead Female for Personal Velocity (2002)
2nd place for the New York Film Critics Circle Award for Best Supporting Actress for Personal Velocity (2002)
Won the Florida Film Critics Circle Award for Best Cast for A Mighty Wind (2003)
Nominated for the Phoenix Film Critics Society Award for Best Cast for A Mighty Wind (2003)
Nominated for a Gotham Independent Film Award for Best Ensemble Cast for For Your Consideration (2006)
Nominated for a Saturn Award for Best Supporting Actress for Superman Returns (2006)
Nominated for a Independent Spirit Award for Best Lead Female for Broken English (2007)
Nominated for a Fright Meter Awards for Best Supporting Actress for The Eye (2008)
Nominated for a Saturn Award for Best Supporting Actress in Streaming Presentation for Lost in Space'' (2019)

References

External links

 

1968 births
20th-century American actresses
21st-century American actresses
Actresses from Baltimore
Actresses from Mississippi
Actresses from New York City
American women singers
American film actresses
American mandolinists
American television actresses
Living people
People from Laurel, Mississippi
People from Greenwich Village
State University of New York at Purchase alumni
American twins
People from the East Village, Manhattan
American Catholics